Renuka Gurung is a Nepali politician and ex-State Minister of Women, Children and Senior Citizens. She was a member of the House of Representatives of the federal parliament of Nepal. She was elected under the proportional representation system from Federal Socialist Forum, Nepal. Previously, she had lost as Deputy-mayor candidate with just 99 votes. She is also a member of the parliamentary International Relations Committee.

References

Living people
Place of birth missing (living people)
21st-century Nepalese politicians
21st-century Nepalese women
Nepal MPs 2017–2022
People from Khotang District
1968 births
Gurung people
People's Socialist Party, Nepal politicians